Oum Er-Rbia (Berber: ⴰⵙⵉⴼ ⵏ ⵉⵙⴰⴼⴻⵏ, "the mother of springtime", spelling Oum el- rbia, is a large, long and high-throughput river in central Morocco.

With an average water throughput of 105 m3/s, Oum Er-Rbia is the second-largest river in Morocco after the Sebou River. It originates in the Middle Atlas and passes through the city of Khénifra, arriving at its mouth at the Atlantic Ocean at the port of Azemmour, located on its left bank. Oum Er-Rbia has six dams, the most important of which is Al Massira Dam. Its most important tributaries are El-Abid River, Tessaoute River, and Lakhdar River.

The historical Berber nickname of the river was Asif n Isaffen, meaning "the river of rivers". According to scholars, the original Berber common name of the river is Wansifen and was only changed recently, circa 16th or 17th century, and a nearby village called Oum Rabia might have influenced this change.

Oum Er-Rbia is fed by a large number of groundwater springs. The area near its headwaters is called "The Forty Springs" as a result, although that is a poetic term rather than an exact count.

Gallery

References

Rivers of Morocco